MOR Music TV was an American cable television network that ran music videos 24 hours a day. However, as it played each music video, viewers had the opportunity to buy the album by calling a toll-free number in the same manner as the Home Shopping Network or QVC, and was offered to cable systems with the same revenue sharing opportunities for cable operators from album sales as HSN and QVC offered for item sales. The music ranged from light country to soft rock with no hard rock (let alone heavy metal) or rap music.

The network's name has a double meaning - "MOR" refers to both the word "more" as in "more music" but is also an acronym for "middle of the road", referring to its musical format of light AC and country songs.

The channel closed on August 31, 1997.

See also
List of defunct television networks in the United States

References

External links
 MOR Music TV promo
 MOR Music news articles

Defunct television networks in the United States
Music video networks in the United States
Shopping networks in the United States
Television channels and stations established in 1992
1992 establishments in the United States
Television channels and stations disestablished in 1997
1997 disestablishments in the United States